Sorted is a men's magazine with two iterations; one in 2004 and one in 2007.

Russell Church of Brighton founded a magazine in 2004 entitled Sorted that was geared at teenage boys, but folded after only four editions were published. Press Gazette reported that Sorted had launched with nearly one million pounds worth of backing and print runs of 200,000.

In 2007, Steve Legg of Littlehampton started publishing a bi-monthly magazine under the name Sorted. It is a Christian publication, but is written with the intent of interesting readers of any faith.

References

External links

2007 establishments in the United Kingdom
Religious magazines published in the United Kingdom
Christian magazines
Magazines established in 2007